WISR (680 AM) is a commercial radio station licensed to Butler, Pennsylvania.  The station was the first to go on the air in Butler County, doing so on September 26, 1941.  The station was the last to be granted a broadcast license before the FCC halted the licensing of any additional stations until after World War II.  It has always broadcast on AM 680 with a maximum power output of 250 Watts, non-directional.  WISR had operated as a daytime-only station until it was granted limited nighttime power in the late 1980s.

The station has a construction permit for an FM translator (W298CW) that would allow it to operate at 107.5 MHz.  The permit was granted January 25, 2018. The FM translator officially signed on air September 28, 2021, making WISR available on both the AM and FM bands, and was licensed effective October 15, 2021.  After more than two decades of ownership under the Butler County Radio Network, WISR was sold to Pittsburgh Radio Partners in September 2022.  After less than two months, St. Barnabas Broadcasting announced that it would acquire WISR and its affiliate stations from Pittsburgh Radio Partners.

History

First in Butler County: a family affair
WISR was the brainchild of local businessman David Rosenblum, who felt that the community could use a local radio station to promote its community and events.  Naming the station after his father, Isaac Samuel Rosenblum, David Rosenblum managed the station and sold airtime, with his wife Georgia keeping the books.  The couple continued to operate the radio station until their deaths in the early 1950s.  It was at that time that the Rosenblums' son Joel, assumed the operations of WISR.  Joel Rosenblum's brother Ray later owned and managed a station of his own some 25 miles to the east, known as AM 1380 WACB (now WKFO) Kittanning.

WISR, like most other small-town stations of its ilk, was a mixture of both programs and music.  A popular program was a buy-sell-trade program called 'The Phone Party', hosted by advertising sales representative Guy Travaglio, who left the station in the 1990s to pursue a career in politics.  Midday on-air personality Pat Parker took over the show, which is now heard on Saturdays starting after the 10am CBS News and continuing until 11am.

Another popular program was 'The Larry Berg Show', hosted by another advertising sales rep, Larry Berg, who joined WISR after completing a 14-year tenure as owner of then-competitor present-affiliate stations WBUT and WLER-FM.  Berg's show continued until his retirement on February 1, 2001.  The show was renamed "It's Your Turn" and today is hosted by morning show host Dave Malarkey.

Most low-powered daytime-only radio stations were granted permission by the FCC to begin limited nighttime power operations in 1988.  WISR was one of these stations, and prior to the nighttime authorization, had never used satellite technology on the air, relying on world and national news via UPI wire service.  After nighttime power was granted, WISR signed an affiliation agreement with CBS news, introducing satellite technology to its listeners.

1997: duopoly sale
Joel Rosenblum continued to operate WISR out of its original studio on North Main Street in downtown Butler until 1997, when he agreed to sell the station to Brandon Communications Systems, Incorporated.  That company, headed by Robert C. Brandon and his brother Ronald, was the licensee of WISR's crosstown competitor, WBUT and WLER-FM, which first signed on the air in 1949.  

Prior to the sale, WISR had programmed a format of both talk and adult contemporary music.  In an effort to make the three stations compete less with each other, Brandon Communications switched the format from adult contemporary to one of MOR and easy listening music.

The station, which had progressed very little in terms of technology up to this point, invested in computerized hard-disk audio, provided by DCS.

WLER-FM evolved out of the former FM license that had been issued to WISR.  The station had been originally known as WISR-FM until the Rosenblum ownership returned the license to the FCC, failing to make a go with it in these early years of FM.  The license was recovered by WBUT's ownership years later.

Larry Berg, the former owner of competitor WBUT AM/FM from 1964 until 1978, resurfaced at WISR a few years later, where he hosted his own afternoon talk show and sold airtime.

Brandon ownership era ends

Brandon Communications Systems then changed its name to the Butler County Radio Network soon after the acquisition of WISR.  A few years later, the Brandon brothers, one by one, sold their interests in the station to the present ownership made up of four local entrepreneurs, but the Butler County Radio Network has remained the name of the licensee.  In 2003, WISR moved from its longtime location at 357 North Main Street to a new location on Hollywood Drive in Pullman Commerce Center, located on the south edge of Butler just off Route 8 south, sharing space with WBUT and WLER.  In late 2013, the trio of radio stations then moved from Pullman Center to its current location on Pillow Street.

WISR today
WISR's current format is a mixture of news, talk, sports, and classic hits music, and continues its affiliation with the CBS radio network, which it has maintained since being granted nighttime power.  It is also Butler County's exclusive radio home to the Pittsburgh Penguins, Pittsburgh Pirates, Pittsburgh Steelers, and Knoch High School sports.  Longtime personalities Dave Malarkey and Pat Parker have each been with WISR for many years, with Malarkey first joining the station in 1973, and Parker in 1987.

Current music programming
WISR's music rotation features songs and artists primarily from the 1950s, 1960s, and 1970s. In addition to music featured on a typical "oldies" format, WISR digs deeper with forgotten hits, B-sides, and the occasional album cut. From 10:00pm–5:00am, WISR adopts an "all smooth" overnight rotation. On Sunday evenings, WISR spins the "oldies" at 5:00, the 60s at 6:00, the 70s at 7:00, and an hour of classic standards at 8:00 before switching to the overnight rotation at 9:00.

WISR offers a variety of music-related shows including:

 The Stax O' Wax Show w/ Michael Crowley - Fridays from 4:00 - 6:00
 The Mr. 60s Rock & Roll Oldies Show w/ Ron Marowitz - Saturday mornings from 9:00 - 10:00
 Greatest Hits USA w/ Chuck Taylor - Saturdays after the noon news
 WISR Album Spotlight Series w/ Michael Crowley - Certain Sunday evenings beginning at 7:00
 Today In Music History w/ Michael Crowley - Weekdays during the 9:00am news and the 5:00pm extended news block.

WISR features Christmas music during the holiday season, beginning the Friday after Thanksgiving and ending on December 31.

Current news programming
Dave Malarkey hosts the morning show on WISR weekdays from 5:30am–9:00am, featuring a mixture of news and music.

WISR currently offers a wide variety of news programming including CBS radio national news updates at the top of most hours followed by local news 6am-5pm weekdays. There are extended news blocks at both noon and 5:00 weekday afternoons featuring local news, sports, weather, and obituaries. Additionally, Tracey Morgan hosts a talk segment weekday afternoons beginning at 12:30 featuring discussions with local experts about local news and events. Pat Parker hosts the Phone Party, a buy/sell/trade program Saturday mornings from 10:00-11:00.

External links

News and talk radio stations in the United States
ISR
Radio stations established in 1941